Lady Double Dealer may refer to:

"Lady Double Dealer", a song by Deep Purple from Stormbringer
"Lady Double Dealer", a song by Krokus from Metal Rendez-vous